Cade Johnson (born April 10, 1998) is an American football wide receiver for the Seattle Seahawks of the National Football League (NFL). He played college football at South Dakota State.

Early life and high school
Johnson grew up in Papillion, Nebraska and attended Bellevue West High School. As a senior, he caught 43 passes for 1,061 yards and 16 touchdowns and was named first-team All-State.

College career
Johnson redshirted his true freshman season after joining the team as a walk-on. As a redshirt freshman he caught 23 passes for 318 yards and three touchdowns and returned 30 kickoffs for a school-record 839 yards with two touchdowns and was named the Missouri Valley Football Conference (MVFC) All-Newcomer team. He led the Jackrabbits with 67 receptions for 1,332 yards and a single-season school-record 17 touchdown catches in his redshirt sophomore season and was named first-team All-MVFC. As a redshirt junior, Johnson was named a first-team All-American by The Associated Press and Walter Camp as well as first-team All-MVFC after finishing the season with 72 catches for 1,222 yards and eight touchdowns. After South Dakota State's 2020 season was canceled due to the COVID-19 pandemic, Johnson initially entered the transfer portal with the intention of transferring to an FBS Power Five program for his final season before ultimately deciding to declare for the 2021 NFL Draft.

Professional career

Johnson signed with the Seattle Seahawks as an undrafted free agent on May 14, 2021. He was waived on August 31, 2021 and re-signed to the practice squad the next day. He was released on November 24, but re-signed a week later. He signed a reserve/future contract with the Seahawks on January 10, 2022.

On August 30, 2022, Johnson was waived by the Seahawks and signed to the practice squad the next day. He signed a reserve/future contract on January 17, 2023.

Personal life
Johnson's father, Clester Johnson, played college football at Nebraska and was a member of the team's 1994 and 1995 National Championship teams. His older brother, C.J., played wide receiver at the University of Wyoming. His little brother, Keagan, is a wide receiver for the University of Iowa.

References

External links
South Dakota State Jackrabbits bio

1998 births
Living people
People from Papillion, Nebraska
Players of American football from Nebraska
American football wide receivers
South Dakota State Jackrabbits football players
Seattle Seahawks players